North Beach is an unincorporated community in Lane County, Oregon, United States. It lies on a strip of land between Siltcoos Lake on the south and Woahink Lake to the north.

References

Unincorporated communities in Lane County, Oregon
Unincorporated communities in Oregon